PHL 293B, also known as Kinman's dwarf, is a low-metallicity blue compact dwarf galaxy about 22.6 Mpc from the Earth in the constellation Aquarius.

It had a very likely associated, notable, blue-light, long-lived star with constant outbursts or a large supernova observed to have faded and which then disappeared. Although this bright visible jet-producing object responsible for broad hydrogen emission lines with P Cygni profiles was widely considered to be a luminous blue variable ejecting matter, other studies posited the mentioned, competing, explanations for the bright light source within.

Observation history
PHL 293 was first listed as entry 293 in a catalogue of faint blue stars published by Guillermo Haro and Willem Jacob Luyten in 1962. The acronym PHL has since been applied to distinguish it from other HL catalogues; it is most commonly referred to by astronomers as PHL 293B. The galaxy was identified as a blue compact dwarf, a type of small irregular galaxy undergoing a strong burst of star formation.

The spectrum of PHL 293B is unusual both for its low metallicity and for broad hydrogen emission lines with P Cygni profiles. These are interpreted as being from a large luminous blue variable star in the galaxy. The star is believed to have been undergoing an outburst during previous observations, an interpretation is disputed by some publications. An alternative explanation would be a long-lived type IIn supernova, similar to the transient event of  SDSS1133. These emission features in the spectrum of the galaxy faded during 2019 and by the end of the year had disappeared  (at least visibly), likely due to the disappearance of a bright star of the galaxy.

See also
 AG Carinae
 Markarian 177
 LBV 1806-20
 Eta Carinae

References

Aquarius (constellation)
Dwarf galaxies
SDSS objects
Luminous blue variables